The Azamgarh alcohol poisonings resulted in the deaths of 39 people in the city of Azamgarh in Uttar Pradesh, India, In October 2013, due to consumption of moonshine mixed with methanol. This is one of the worst alcohol poisonings in the state. However, the locals have contested the death toll, claiming 40 people had died in the particular incident.

See also
List of alcohol poisonings in India

References 

Alcohol-related deaths in India
Crime in Uttar Pradesh
2013 disasters in India
Azamgarh